Jordan Alan is an American film director, producer and television commercial director.

In 1985, Alan made a 35mm film trailer starring Sandra Bullock. The trailer was screened by South African film producer Anant Singh at Technicolor in New York City. The trailer's success led to the financing of Terminal Bliss and helped bring Alan to Los Angeles.

His films include Kiss & Tell, The Gentleman Bandit, and Cats Dancing on Jupiter, completed in 2011 and unreleased as of December 2016, starring  Amanda Righetti, his ex-wife. His company, Bliss Sinema, projects in development include the film Deconstruction Red.

He has shot TV commercials for clients including 1-800-DENTIST, 1-800-USA-EYES, Invisalign, LA Sight Laser Center, and LA Solar Group.

Personal life
Alan married actress Amanda Righetti on April 29, 2006, in Oahu. Righetti filed for divorce in 2017. In 2013, the couple had a son.

Filmography

References

External links

American film directors
Living people
Year of birth missing (living people)